The Alberta Federation of Labour (AFL) is the Alberta provincial trade union federation of the Canadian Labour Congress. It has a membership of approximately 170,000 from 29 affiliated unions.

The AFL was founded in 1912, when mining workers and tradespeople in Lethbridge organized to demand the establishment of occupational health and safety regulations in Alberta's coal fields which, at the time, had the highest workplace mortality rates in the world.

Today, the Federation continues its tradition of advocacy on issues it perceives to be of concern to working people. Often these issues relate directly to the workplace, but sometimes they relate to broader social issues such as education, pensions, energy policy and public health care.

News

On April 9, 2013, the AFL obtained a list of all employers who had been granted the ability to hire guest workers under the high-skilled section of the Temporary Foreign Worker program. The list of more than 2,400 employers included hundreds of fast food restaurants.

In August 2014, the Alberta Federation of Labour was fined $50,000 by the Canadian Radio-television and Telecommunications Commission for violating rules with 2012 provincial election robocalls.

External links
www.afl.org
Alberta Federation of Labour – Web Archive created by the University of Toronto Libraries

References

Canadian Labour Congress
Provincial federations of labour (Canada)
Organizations based in Edmonton
Trade unions established in 1912
1912 establishments in Alberta